The 1998 Critérium du Dauphiné Libéré was the 50th edition of the cycle race and was held from 7 June to 14 June 1998. The race started in Villeurbanne and finished in Megève. The race was won by Armand de Las Cuevas of the Banesto team.

Teams
Fifteen teams, containing a total of 120 riders, participated in the race:

Route

Stages

Prologue
7 June 1998 – Villeurbanne,  (ITT)

Stage 1
8 June 1998 – Villeurbanne to Charvieu-Chavagneux,

Stage 2
9 June 1998 – Charvieu-Chavagneux to Vals-les-Bains,

Stage 3
10 June 1998 – Vals-les-Bains to Mont Ventoux,

Stage 4
11 June 1998 – Saint-Paul-Trois-Châteaux to Saint-Paul-Trois-Châteaux,  (ITT)

Stage 5
12 June 1998 – Crest to Grenoble,

Stage 6
13 May 1998 – Challes-les-Eaux to Megève Côte 2000,

Stage 7
14 June 1998 – Megève to Megève,

General classification

References

Further reading

External links

1998
1998 in French sport
June 1998 sports events in Europe